Niko Zisi (born 24 August 1995) is an Albanian professional footballer who plays as an attacking midfielder for German club SV Donaustauf.

Club career

Early career
Zisi spent much of his early career in Greece by playing notably with Aris youth teams. He returned in Albania in September 2014 to play for Dinamo Tirana. One year later, he returned again in Greece, this time to play for Achilleas Triandrias.

Elbasani
In January 2017, Zisi joined Albanian First Division side Bylis Ballsh and was sent on loan at fellow side Elbasani until the end of the season. He made his debut as professional footballer on 18 February by playing in the second half of the 1–3 home loss to Apolonia Fier.

His first score-sheet contributions came later on 21 April in the 2–2 draw against the same opponent, which brought Elbasani closer to relegation. Zisi finished the second half of 2016–17 season by making 10 league appearances, scoring once as Elbasani was relegated after losing the relegation final 2–0 against Sopoti Librazhd.

Bylis Ballsh
In June 2017, Zisi returned to the club and signed a one-year contract. He made his first appearance of the season on 13 September in the match against Tomori Berat won 0–3. He opened his scoring account on matchday 3 in the 3–1 home win over Shënkolli. Later on 4 November, Zisi made a Man of the Match performance by scoring the winner against away against Tirana, ending their undefeated streak and becoming the first player in 2017–18 season to score against them. Zisi concluded the 2017–18 by scoring 9 goals and giving 9 assists.

Kamza
On 13 August 2018, Kazma completed the signing of Zisi from Bylis Ballsh for a fee of €40,000. The player was presented three days later, signing a contract running until June 2021.

SV Donaustauf
After it was reported, that Zisi had joined Greek Super League Greece 2 club A.E. Karaiskakis in late-December 2019 - which, however, never officially was confirmed - Zisi moved to German Bayernliga Süd club SV Donaustauf in January 2020.

Style of play
Zisi has been compared to Bernard Berisha by Bylis Ballsh fans due to their similar playing style and pace.

Career statistics

References

External links
AFA profile

1995 births
Living people
Sportspeople from Fier
Albanian footballers
Albanian expatriate footballers
Association football midfielders
Kategoria e Parë players
Kategoria Superiore players
KF Elbasani players
KF Bylis Ballsh players
FC Kamza players
Albanian expatriate sportspeople in Germany
Expatriate footballers in Germany